WrestleMania XIV (marketed as WrestleMania dX raided) was the 14th annual WrestleMania professional wrestling pay-per-view (PPV) event produced by the World Wrestling Federation (WWF; WWE as of 2002). It took place on March 29, 1998, at the FleetCenter in Boston, Massachusetts. A total of eight matches were held at the event.

This pay-per-view event was notable for the involvement of boxer Mike Tyson, who acted as a ring enforcer for the main event. In the main event, Stone Cold Steve Austin defeated Shawn Michaels to win the WWF Championship for the first time; Michaels performed despite a severe injury sustained during a match at the Royal Rumble and would not compete again until SummerSlam in 2002. This was also the first WrestleMania event since 1986 to not to feature Bret Hart, who jumped to the rival World Championship Wrestling the previous year.

Production

Background
WrestleMania is the World Wrestling Federation's (WWF, now WWE) flagship pay-per-view (PPV) event, having first been held in 1985. It has become the longest-running professional wrestling event in history and is held annually between mid-March to mid-April. It was the first of the WWF's original four pay-per-views, which includes Royal Rumble, SummerSlam, and Survivor Series, which were dubbed the "Big Four", and was considered one of the "Big Five" PPVs, along with King of the Ring. WrestleMania XIV was scheduled to be held on March 29, 1998, at the FleetCenter in Boston, Massachusetts. In print advertisements, the event was billed as "WrestleMania dX raided".

Storylines
After Legion of Doom lost their WWF Tag Team Championship to The New Age Outlaws, they were assaulted by The New Age Outlaws and D-Generation X. At the Royal Rumble, they lost a championship match largely because Road Dogg handcuffed Hawk to the outside of the ring. Following this, they suffered two defeats by the NWA members Jeff Jarrett and Barry Windham and finally on the February 23 episode of Raw Is War, they lost again to The New Age Outlaw when, despite having the match all but won, the non-legal Hawk did not leave the ring and while the referee was busy removing him, Animal was struck by the title belts and lost the match. Following the bout, the two brawled all the way to the back and announced their dissolution, not appearing again until WrestleMania.

After the Montreal Screwjob, Owen Hart was the only member of the Hart family to remain with the company, and after a temporary absence returned during D-Generation X: In Your House to attack Shawn Michaels. Following this, he turned his attention to Hunter Hearst Helmsley (who would later be known simply as Triple H) and the European Championship that Michaels had given to Helmsley as a Christmas present. After weeks of deterring a championship match by way of a fractured kneecap, Triple H finally acquiesced to a match on January 26's Raw Is War, only for the Artist Formerly Known as Goldust (who was dressing up from week to week in a bid for attention) to appear in Helmsley's place. After Hart won the match, WWF Commissioner Slaughter declared the disguise so convincing that he upheld the decision and awarded the championship belt to Hart. On the March 2 episode of Raw Is War, Hart defended the title against Mark Henry, but Chyna came to the ring and pushed Hart off the turnbuckle allowing Henry to lock on a bearhug, but before he could submit she gave an obvious low blow to Henry, resulting in a disqualification in favour of Hart. The following week in a match against Barry Windham, Hart landed awkwardly on his ankle, suffering a sprained ankle with ligament damage. On a special Tuesday edition of Raw Is War on March 17, the following week Hart joined the commentary team with a supportive case on his leg, and while commentating, Triple H came to the ringside and goaded him into an impromptu title defence despite his cast. During the match, Chyna appeared and hit his ankle with a bat, allowing Helmsley to win the title back.

Owing to his jealousy over the attention his wife and valet, Sable, was garnering from the crowd, Marc Mero tried to cover up her provocative clothing and eventually sent her to the back, replacing her with The Artist Formerly Known as Goldust, who at the time was dressing up from week to week in his own bid of self-attention. Although the two worked well together, Goldust's valet Luna Vachon grew vocally disdainful of Sable, who was also being mocked by Mero and Goldust, causing Sable to eventually fight back. As the two women brawled, their partners tried to separate them but when Goldust grabbed Sable to restrain her, Mero attacked him. The two men had a match on Raw where both women were handcuffed to the ring posts in order to prevent their brawling, but as the referee was knocked down, Goldust stole the key and unchained Vachon who attacked Sable with make up, painting her face. Goldust then challenged Mero and Sable to a mixed tag team match at WrestleMania XIV.

After successively beating members of the Nation of Domination until Mark Henry turned on him, Ken Shamrock beat the Intercontinental Heavyweight Champion Rocky Maivia (later known as The Rock) despite being hit with a foreign object. The Rock convinced the referee that it was, in fact, he who suffered an illegal attack and the referee reversed his decision. The following month at No Way Out of Texas: In Your House, Shamrock capitalized on the in-fighting of the Nation, due to leadership disputes between Faarooq and The Rock, by pinning the champion in a ten-man tag team match.

At the end of the inaugural Hell in a Cell match at Badd Blood: In Your House, just as The Undertaker looked to have won the match against Shawn Michaels, the lights went out and a masked man came to the ring and delivered a tombstone piledriver to the shocked Undertaker. The masked man was revealed to be Kane, Undertaker's (kayfabe) half-brother and, despite the animosity and the presence of Paul Bearer, Undertaker vowed never to fight his little brother. Before Undertaker's casket match with Michaels, D-Generation X claimed Kane had joined them, but in fact, he came to the ring to assist Undertaker. The alliance was short-lived, however, as during the Royal Rumble event, Kane came to the ring and locked Undertaker in his casket before setting it ablaze, presuming his brother dead. On the March 2 episode of Raw Is War, Kane's opponent, Stone Cold Steve Austin, was taken out by D-Generation X and with nothing to do, Bearer ordered the timekeeper to deliver a ten-bell salute for The Undertaker's passing, before telling Kane to tombstone him. After he did, more bells were heard to ring, this time signaling Undertaker's theme music. The ringing continued much longer than normal, with Bearer denying the possibility of it being Undertaker. Eventually, a sarcophagus appeared on the top of the ramp and after lightning struck it, The Undertaker sat up before revealing that he had been through hell and talked to his parents to tell them that he would have to go back on his vow. The week before WrestleMania, Kane came to the ring and began to display similar supernatural powers as his brother, striking the TitanTron with lightning, as well as the announce table, before striking a crew worker with lightning, setting him on fire; Undertaker was shown on the same episode speaking to his parents' gravestones, revealing it may have to take the damnation of his soul to reunite the troubled family.

In January, Stone Cold Steve Austin won the Royal Rumble match while Shawn Michaels retained his WWF Championship, both under the auspices of Mike Tyson from the director's box. The following week on Raw Is War, Vince McMahon revealed that Tyson would be the special guest referee for WrestleMania's main event until Austin appeared and gave the finger to Tyson, offering him a fight and proclaiming the wrestling ring to be his, not Tyson's. At the ensuing press conference, McMahon announced that due to the explosive situation Tyson's role was being changed to that of ring enforcer. On the February 2 episode of Raw Is War, in a scheduled match against Road Dogg, D-Generation X stormed the match and tied Austin in the ropes, shouting abuse in his face and rubbing the championship belt in his face, taunting him with it until Cactus Jack and Chainsaw Charlie came to his aid. The following week, Austin stole the championship belt from Michaels in the hope of baiting him in a singles match, but the partnership of D-Generation X and The New Age Outlaws continued. This led to a "non-sanctioned" eight-man tag match at No Way Out of Texas: In Your House, which Michaels declined to participate in and that Austin won by pinning Road Dogg. With WrestleMania drawing closer, on the March 2 episode of Raw Is War, Tyson appeared once again to be interviewed only for Michaels to interrupt and challenge Tyson to a fight. After both entourages left the ring, the two grabbed at each other until Michaels ripped Tyson's shirt revealing a DX T-shirt showing the enforcer's degenerate alliance; Later in the evening, as Austin came out to take place in a match against Kane, he saw Triple H on the ramp and walked over to him, only to turn round into a Sweet Chin Music by Michaels which knocked him out, something that occurred again the following week. Also that week, during a St. Patrick's Day Tuesday broadcast of Raw Is War on March 17, Austin called out Vince McMahon and attacked him for describing Tyson as "the baddest man on the planet", but McMahon would not be goaded into a fight, as he instead forced Austin to fight Rocky Maivia the following episode, just before WrestleMania.

Event 

Chris Warren and The DX Band opened the show by performing hard rock versions of "America the Beautiful" and "The Star-Spangled Banner". The audience did not react well to the performance, booing the band during and after their songs. This segment was edited off all subsequent home video releases as well as the WWE Network.

Preliminary matches 
The night began with the secret guests in the tag team battle royal being revealed as the reunited Legion of Doom now known as LOD 2000, with Sunny as their new valet. Savio Vega was first eliminated by Chainz meaning his tag team partner, Miguel Perez, had to leave too. Kurrgan illegally entered the ring to enact revenge on Sniper and Recon by eliminating them on behalf of The Jackyl. Barry Windham also illegally entered to eliminate Chainz, and so left his partner Bradshaw. The final four teams lasted a while until Skull was eliminated by Henry Godwinn, which meant The Disciples of Apocalypse were eliminated. 8-Ball then eliminated Phineas Godwinn, which meant The Godwinns were then eliminated. Afterwards The Godwinns attacked LOD 2000 with slop buckets before leaving. The Midnight Express tried to keep Animal out of the ring while double-teaming Hawk, but once Animal re-entered the ring LOD 2000 simultaneously eliminated both Bob and Bart, leaving LOD 2000 the last team standing and the winners of the battle royal.

The second match was a Light Heavyweight Championship match, with Taka Michinoku defending his title against Águila; this would be the first and only time the championship was defended at WrestleMania, though its successor the Cruiserweight Championship would be. After throwing Taka out the ring and baseball sliding into him, Águila hit an asai moonsault outside the ring, but was soon the victim of a springboard crossbody after Taka reversed a suplex from the apron. Águila almost won the match with a moonsault crossbody into a pin, but remained on the offensive with a frankensteiner. Taka tried to land the Michinoku Driver, but as Aguila flipped out and attempted a hurricarana, Taka managed a powerbomb reversal. He soon stopped a high flying dive with a dropkick before successfully executing a Michinoku Driver and picking up the win. After the match, both contestants shook each other's hand and celebrated together. Also, partway into the matchup, Jim Ross made a fleeting comment about the date of Taka's title win, December 7, the date of the Japanese bombing of Pearl Harbor, calling it "ironic enough". This incident went largely unnoticed, only causing a slight stir in the wrestling community.

Triple H made his way to the ring with his theme played by the DX Band. Before Owen Hart came to the ring, Commissioner Slaughter handcuffed himself to Chyna so that she would not interfere, despite her protestations. The match began with Hart pummelling Helmsley with fists before sliding out of the ring, when Triple H tried to jump from the apron he met with the crowd barrier. After an early powerbomb Hart attempted to lock in the sharpshooter, but Helmsley reversed it and started some offensive maneuvers of his own, kicking Hart in the turnbuckle and delivering a suplex. Hart suffered a cut to the bridge of his nose from a boot to the face, after which Triple H began to work on Hart's damaged ankle, dropping his knee onto it and stretching it. After avoiding another kick to the face and pulling Helmsley's crotch onto the ring post, and managed to take advantage, reversing a powerbomb into the sharpshooter, but Chyna, having to pull Slaughter, pulled Triple H to the rope for the break. Chyna then threw white powder in Slaughter's face causing a worried Hart to check on him, as he turned round to face the ring, Chyna low-blowed him from outside allowing Triple H to successfully land the Pedigree on him and take the win. After she was freed from the handcuffs, Chyna shoved Slaughter into the crowd.

Marc Mero and Goldust began the match but Goldust soon tagged in Luna Vachon, requiring Sable to be tagged in too. However, Vachon simply ran around the outside of the ring with Sable chasing her and tagged her partner back in. Wanting to get her hands on Vachon, Sable double-teamed Goldust with a boot to the face after an Irish whip from Mero but could not get Vachon to enter the ring. A near-pinfall came from a running crossbody from Mero and following this the two ran into each other, causing both men to crawl and tag in the women. Sable straddled Vachon and punched her around the face before kicking her in the midsection and face in the turnbuckle and attacking Goldust, then running back to clothesline Vachon over the ropes. Vachon tagged Goldust in but before Sable would do the same, she struck him in the face, then let Mero take over who had his TKO reversed into a DDT. Mero too would reverse the Curtain Call allowing him the chance to try a moonsault pin to a standing Goldust. After Vachon struck a running Mero with his knee, Mero went to punch her but ducked out of the way as Goldust ran to her rescue, causing him to inadvertently knock her off the apron. Mero then executed the TKO, but Luna interrupted the pin count, jumping on Mero's back resulting in Sable tagging in as Mero wandered around the ring with Vachon on his back. Sable tried pinning Goldust, but the referee was distracted and as he finally began to count, Sable leapt off Goldust so the interfering Vachon would inadvertently bodysplash Goldust. Sable then performed a powerbomb and Mero's TKO to win the bout.

Gennifer Flowers, who was accompanied by Jeff Jarrett and Tennessee Lee had served as the special guest ring announcer for the upcoming Intercontinental Heavyweight Championship match between Ken Shamrock and Rocky Maivia. The fight began along the walkway with a brawl that saw Shamrock whipped into the steel steps before coming inside the ring. The Rock then delivered his People's Elbow, but could not secure a three-count. Shamrock then rolled out of the ring and grabbed a steel chair and when the referee tried to take it off him, he threw the referee into the corner; The Rock quickly grabbed the chair and hit Shamrock with it as the referee recovered. Shamrock pushed out of the pin count and quickly gained the advantage, delivering a belly to belly slam off an Irish whip and then securing his ankle lock in the center of the ring, making The Rock tap. The surrounding members of the Nation jumped into the ring, but Shamrock quickly dispatched them all with suplexes, including the four hundred pound Henry, before reapplying the ankle lock to a bleeding Maivia. Faarooq then ran down from the back and jumped onto the apron, only to look on at The Rock with a smile, before walking away. Eventually, a number of referees (the ones he attacked were actually independent wrestlers or stuntmen put in referee uniforms) and officials appeared, trying to subdue Shamrock. After being surrounded, Shamrock suplexed a referee and then an official before calming down as The Rock was wheeled away on a gurney. Howard Finkel then announced Shamrock had been disqualified for not breaking his ankle hold, causing Shamrock to chase Rock and fight him on the Chris Warren band stage.

The WWF Tag Team Championship match was a Dumpster match, the objective being the first tag team to put their opponents into a dumpster with the lids being closed shut being the winner. It began with Billy Gunn facing Chainsaw Charlie and Road Dogg exchanging blows with Cactus Jack. Trying a Cactus Elbow on Road Dogg, Cactus missed and slammed himself into the dumpster. The Outlaws then focused on Charlie, using a back toss to drop him into the dumpster and as he attempted to climb out they simultaneously slammed the lid shut on the hardcore legends' heads. With Cactus and Charlie both in the dumpster, the Outlaws shut the lid down on them, but Cactus managed to get back up while the Outlaws were celebrating and pushed Road Dogg down to the ground with a mandible claw, pulling him into the dumpster. Both teams took time to recover and began to brawl with weapons in the ring, Cactus Jack pulling out a ladder and climbing it opposite Billy Gunn, only to be pushed off straight into the dumpster outside the ring by a falling Chainsaw Charlie. Road Dogg pulled his partner out and the two focussed their efforts on Charlie, powerbombing him into the dumpster, but Cactus had managed to escape in the meantime. The fight found its way to the backstage area, with both Outlaws throwing Cactus into boxes and promotional toys, but Jack replied with a chair shot to both of them and pulled Billy Gunn onto a wooden crate with a double-arm DDT. Charlie reappeared on a forklift and elevated the wooden crate as Jack dragged Road Dogg onto it too. Charlie then drove the forklift above a backstage dumpster and dropped both opponents inside as Cactus Jack closed the lid to win the WWF Tag Team Championship.

Main event matches 
Before The Undertaker's match with Kane, baseball record-holder Pete Rose came to the ring as the special ring announcer. However, after insulting the home-town team and introducing Kane, the wrestler gave him a tombstone piledriver, starting a tri-year tradition. The Undertaker was preceded by a league of torch-bearing druids to the tune of "O Fortuna". The Undertaker cornered Kane and threw a flurry of punches into him, ducking and reversing Kane's attempts until Kane hit him with a clothesline that he instantly sat up from. Kane then set Undertaker up in a tree of woe to begin his assault of punches and Irish whips and then suplexing Undertaker onto the ropes and delivering a flying club to the neck from the turnbuckle. As The Undertaker began to fight back, Kane threw him into the ropes, but Undertaker retaliated by jumping onto his back, which was met a face-first electric chair. Paul Bearer kept the referee distracted while Kane landed the steel steps onto Undertaker, and repeated the effort a second time while his opponent was lying onto the steps, crushing him between. As the referee tried to keep Kane in check, Bearer slapped Undertaker while walking past him. Kane caught his brother running and delivered a chokeslam, but lifted his shoulders off the mat before the three-count could be made, putting him into a sleeper hold that Undertaker eventually fought out of with a flurry of punches. Undertaker then dropped Kane on top of the ropes and punched him off the apron; he followed this with an over the top rope suicide dive that Kane managed to sidestep, sending Undertaker crashing through the Spanish announce table. As Undertaker made it back into the ring, Kane hit him with a flying lariat. Undertaker tried to give Kane the Tombstone Piledriver, but Kane managed to weigh himself backward onto his own feet and deliver the tombstone himself. Undertaker kicked out and after landing his opponent with a clothesline, he chokeslammed Kane and then delivered a tombstone piledriver of his own; but Kane kicked out. It would eventually take three tombstones with a guillotine leg drop and flying clothesline in between to stop Kane kicking out and sitting up, but as soon as the match was over, Bearer attacked Undertaker and ordered Kane to attack him, which he did with a chair shot to the head and then a tombstone piledriver onto the chair. After Kane and Bearer left, Undertaker sat up and left the ring.

With Mike Tyson enforcing from ringside, the WWF Championship fight began with both wrestlers dancing around each other, engaging in a few light punches before Shawn Michaels escaped the ring and ran back in to take advantage of Stone Cold Steve Austin, but was met with a standing clothesline. Austin followed up by pulling down Michaels' tights revealing his rear. Michaels tried to run at Austin but was flipped over the top rope into Triple H and Chyna. As Triple H threw Austin through the crowd barrier, the referee ordered him and Chyna to leave ringside, but Austin followed and fought with them up to the entranceway. Michaels caught up with him and hit Austin with a cymbal from the band stage, before Irish whipping him into the dumpster. As the match resumed in the ring, Austin met Michaels's high-risk maneuver with a clothesline and then ran him into the turnbuckle and picking him up for an inverted atomic drop. Michaels attempt to pick up some momentum saw him picked up and dropped onto the ropes, but Michaels managed to push Austin away as he attempted a stunner. When he tried to escape the ring though, Austin shoved him forcing the champion to fall upon the announce table. After Austin slowed the match down with a sleeper, Michaels tried to pull his knee into the ring post but was instead pulled into it himself. Austin then tried to rush at Michaels, but was back tossed into the crowd and struck with the ring bell. Michaels used the momentum to take advantage inside the ring, delivering a snapmare and then a low kick to the grounded Austin, but as he took time to offend the audience. Austin briefly picked up some speed throwing Michaels out of the ring, but just as quickly lost ground as his opponent repeatedly worked on Austin's left knee, throwing it into the ring post and then kicking and dropping onto it back inside the ring. When Austin tried to recover outside of the ring, he was met with a baseball slide launching him over the announce table and was instantly thrown back into the ring by Tyson, where he soon suffered a figure-four leglock that Michaels illegally elevated using the second and third ring rope. Austin's eventual counter was stopped by a rope break. Austin then tried to reverse a standing sleeper hold by throwing Michaels back into the turnbuckle, but unwittingly trapped referee Mike Chioda who fell unconscious. With both men on the floor, Michaels recovered with a kip-up and landed a high-flying elbow drop, getting in position to taunt for his finisher. As Austin eventually stood up, he ducked the superkick, attempting a stunner on Michaels as he turned around only to be thrown into the ropes and met again with a Sweet Chin Music which he grabbed, spinning Michaels round and finishing with a Stone Cold Stunner. Tyson jumped into the ring to make a quick three count and the new champion celebrated by tossing the enforcer an Austin 3:16 T-shirt. When Shawn Michaels stood up, he confronted Tyson about his turn, but was met with a punch that instantly floored him, and draped with Austin's T-shirt.

Reception 
In 2009, Rob McNew of 411Mania gave the event a rating of 8.0 [Very Good], stating, "This was a far better show than I remember it being. The only match that really sucked wasn’t very long, and even then it helped cement The Rock’s heel character. The historic first meeting of Kane and Undertaker is far better than it has any right being, and the main event truly delivered as Shawn Michaels turned in arguably the most gutsy performance of his career."

In 2020, Richard Staple of EWrestlingNews gave the event a rating of Thumbs Up, stating, "In terms of where this WrestleMania ranks all time, it is probably more in the middle of the pack. There wasn’t anything actively terrible, the main event was very good and the under card had some quality showings and some surprise hidden gems. If you have a couple of hours to spare, I wouldn’t mind recommending this show, if just for the historical value alone. Thumbs up for WrestleMania 14."

In 2022, John Canton of TJRWrestling gave the event a rating of 7/10, stating, "If you’ve read my recaps from the beginning you know that there have been a lot of shows where there were one or two excellent matches while everything else sucked. In this case, we didn’t have an excellent match that I gave 4* or above to, but there were four matches that I gave 3* and above. The other matches that didn’t reach that level like Shamrock/Rock and Undertaker/Kane told very good stories. This wasn’t a WrestleMania that blew me away with its matches. What it did was impress me with solid booking throughout the whole show while the guys (and girls) in the ring put on a good show. It was a great example of how hot WWE was during this time period as they were ushering in the Attitude Era that was the most successful in company history."

Aftermath 
The result of the main event heralded a changing of the guard in the World Wrestling Federation. Shawn Michaels, who had been a major superstar in the company for many years, having won his first WWF Championship at WrestleMania two years previously, took a four-year hiatus from wrestling due to a severe back injury sustained during the casket match against Undertaker at the Royal Rumble. He made several ostensible one-off appearances as a guest commentator during episodes of Raw Is War in the summer of 1998, and eventually replacing Sgt. Slaughter as a commissioner at the end of the year, holding onto the position for a year and a half. After what was supposed to be a one-time match four years later at SummerSlam, Michaels and the now renamed World Wrestling Entertainment realized that his injuries had healed, and he made a full-time return to wrestling, retiring in 2010 at WrestleMania XXVI, 12 years after this event.

With Stone Cold Steve Austin winning the main event, the Attitude Era was fully ushered in. The scratch logo had started to replace the New Generation logo and began to appear on ring aprons and promotional work during and after this event. The next night on Raw Is War after WrestleMania, the old WWF "winged eagle" world championship belt was retired, and a new belt design with a larger eagle and blue globe debuted (eventually being retired in 2002). The Attitude Era saw Austin's feud with Vince McMahon escalate and two weeks later, Raw Is War beat World Championship Wrestling's Nitro in the ratings war for the first time in eighty-four weeks.

Shawn Michaels' loss was criticized by Triple H the following night on Raw Is War, blaming him for overlooking Tyson's potential double-cross. He delivered a promo saying that he would now helm D-Generation X and turn it into an army and "the first thing you do is look to your blood. You look to your buddies. You look to your friends. You look to the Kliq", and introduced a returning Sean Waltman, under the X-Pac persona, who had jumped ship from World Championship Wrestling (WCW). Later in the evening, it was revealed that Road Dogg and Billy Gunn were also part of the DX Army.

The ongoing saga between The Undertaker and Kane continued unabated. The following night, Paul Bearer challenged Undertaker to a match at Unforgiven: In Your House where the ring would be surrounded by fire and the first man to be set alight would lose, thus giving birth to the Inferno Match.

By winning the fifteen-team battle royal, LOD 2000 won the right to face the WWF Tag Team Champions at Unforgiven. The champions by rights were Cactus Jack and Chainsaw Charlie, but some legal wrangling from The New Age Outlaws saw the match held up on account of the wrong dumpster being used. The vacant titles were disputed in a steel cage match the following night, which the Outlaws won after interference from the newly formed DX Army, concreting their ties, and by handcuffing Charlie to the cage by his neck. Charlie returned to his Terry Funk persona whilst Cactus Jack became Dude Love again while the Outlaws became part of the DX Army achieving further success.

In a tag team match against Ken Shamrock and Steve Blackman, The Rock promised to show Faarooq that the Nation was stronger and more connected than before. The promise was a sour one as, during the match, Rock left Faarooq to suffer the wrath of Shamrock and Blackman, and afterward Faarooq demanded Rock come back out so the two could fight. When Rock returned and squared up to Faarooq, the other members of the Nation turned on him and The Rock proclaimed himself as the new leader.

Before Marc Mero's match with Taka Michinoku the next night, Vachon appeared and challenged Sable to a singles match just between the two of them which Sable promptly accepted. Vachon also announced that it was not to be a traditional wrestling match, because she wanted to humiliate her, and so it would be an evening gown match to be held at Unforgiven.

Results

References

External links 
 The Official Website of WrestleMania XIV

Mike Tyson
Entertainment events in Boston
WrestleMania
1998 in Boston
Professional wrestling in Boston
1998 WWF pay-per-view events
March 1998 events in the United States